The Liberty Party was a minor political party in the United States in the 1840s (with some offshoots surviving into the 1860s). The party was an early advocate of the abolitionist cause and it broke away from the American Anti-Slavery Society (AASS) to advocate the view that the Constitution was an anti-slavery document. William Lloyd Garrison, leader of the AASS, held the contrary view, that the Constitution should be condemned as an evil pro-slavery document. The party included abolitionists who were willing to work within electoral politics to try to influence people to support their goals. By contrast, the radical Garrison opposed voting and working within the system. Many Liberty Party members joined the anti-slavery (but not abolitionist) Free Soil Party in 1848 and eventually helped establish the Republican Party in the 1850s.

Party origin
The party was announced in November 1839 and first gathered in Warsaw, New York. Its first national convention took place in Arcade, New York, on April 1, 1840.

The Liberty Party nominated James G. Birney, a Kentuckian and former slaveholder, for President in 1840 and 1844. The second nominating convention was held in August 1843 in Buffalo, New York. The Liberty Party platform of 1843 resolved "to regard and to treat" the fugitive slave clause of the Constitution "as utterly null and void, and consequently forming no part of the Constitution of the United States" on grounds of "natural right" (natural law). It also contained the following plank:

Resolved, That the Liberty Party ... will demand the absolute and unqualified divorce of the general [i.e., federal] government from slavery, and also the restoration of equality of rights among men, in every State where the party exists, or may exist.

Support and influence
The party did not attract much support. In the 1840 election, Birney received only 6,797 votes and in the 1844 election 62,103 votes (2.3% of the popular vote). However, it may have thrown victory from Henry Clay to James Polk in the 1844 election, with Birney having received 15,800 votes in New York and Polk winning New York by 5,100 votes. If Clay had won New York, he would have had the majority of electoral votes instead of Polk.

A third nominating convention was held in Syracuse, New York in October 1847, endorsing John P. Hale of New Hampshire with 103 votes (there Gerrit Smith received forty-four votes for the nomination, with another twelve scattered votes for others). However, Hale later withdrew due to the subsequent events of 1848.

Candidates

Relationship to the Free Soil Party
In 1848, with the political sentiment stirred up by the Wilmot Proviso controversies and the "Barnburner" (abolitionist) faction of New York Democrats splitting off from the rest of the Democratic Party, there was the possibility of forming a much larger and more influential political grouping devoted to anti-slavery goals—but not all of whom considered themselves to be primarily abolitionists as such, or were willing to work under the Liberty Party name. Therefore, many Liberty Party members met in Buffalo, New York, with other groups in August 1848 to form the Free Soil Party, a party that although opposed to slavery was not strictly speaking abolitionist. A minority which was not willing to merge with the Free Soil Party nominated Gerrit Smith as rump National Liberty Party candidate for 1848 at a convention held on June 14–15, 1848 in Buffalo. Smith went on to win 2,545 votes, less than 1% of the Free Soil vote total.

The Free Soil Party later merged with the Republican Party in 1854, by which time many of the issues originally championed by the Liberty Party had become politically mainstream. A member of the Liberty Party who later rose to great political prominence as a Free-Soiler and Republican was Salmon P. Chase.

Chase had joined the Liberty Party in 1841 and had a significant influence on the Liberty Party platform of 1843–1844 as well as organizing the Southern and Western Liberty Convention in Cincinnati in 1845, where a number of delegates from the Midwest and Upper South met. In order to broaden the appeal of the party, Chase advocated supplementing the almost purely religious and moral Liberty Party rhetoric of the 1840 election with political and constitutional analysis and wished the party to emphasize that its immediate goal was to withdraw all direct federal government support and recognition of slavery (or to "divorce" the federal government from slavery) as opposed to simply demanding the abolition of slavery everywhere in the United States (something which was beyond the legal power of the federal government to accomplish as the Constitution then existed). In 1847–1848, Chase was a strong supporter of the fusion movement which resulted in the formation of the Free Soil Party.

The Liberty Party continued to exist many years afterwards, despite most of its supporters having left to join less-religiously-motivated parties. In the absence of Chase, religious rhetoric in the party's official addresses and platforms increased. The 1848 platform strongly condemned the perceived attempts to moderate the party. That same year, the party began openly advocating various general moralistic policies, such as prohibitions on alcohol, gambling, and prostitution. Other than these religiously motivated restrictions on market activity, the party largely favored free trade and opposed tariffs. One year later, the twenty-second plank of the 1849 platform praised Lysander Spooner's book The Unconstitutionality of Slavery.

In 1852, the party held its national convention on September 30 in Syracuse, New York. The presidential nominee that year was William Goodell of New York and his running mate was S. M. Bell of Virginia. The platform that year only had four planks.

A state convention of the Liberty Party was held in February, 1853, in Syracuse.

By 1856, very little of the Liberty Party remained after most of its members joined the Free Soil Party in 1848 and nearly of all what remained of the party joined the Republicans in 1854. The small remnant of the party renominated Gerrit Smith under the name of the "National Liberty Party".

In 1860, the remnant of the party was also called the Radical Abolitionists. A convention of one hundred delegates was held in Convention Hall, Syracuse, New York, on August 29, 1860. Delegates were in attendance from New York, Pennsylvania, New Jersey, Michigan, Illinois, Ohio, Kentucky, and Massachusetts. Several of the delegates were women.

Gerrit Smith, despite his poor health, fought William Goodell in regard to the nomination for the presidency. In the end, Smith was nominated for president and Samuel McFarland from Pennsylvania was nominated for vice president.

The ticket won 171 popular votes from Illinois and Ohio. In Ohio, a slate of presidential electors pledged to Smith ran with the name of the Union Party.

Other prominent Liberty Party members
 James Appleton, Maine state legislator and Liberty Party nominee for Governor (1842)
 Shepard Cary, Democratic member of Congress from Maine and Liberty Party nominee for Governor (1854)
 Charles Durkee, Wisconsin legislator and Congressman who moved on to the Free Soil party and then to U.S. Senator as a Republican
 Samuel Fessenden, co-founder of the Republican Party and Liberty Party nominee for Maine Governor (1847)
 Ezekiel Holmes, Maine state legislator and two-time Liberty Party nominee for Governor
 Abby Kelley, who spoke at the Liberty Party convention (1843), becoming the first American woman to address a national political convention

Notes

References
 
 
 
 National Party Conventions 1831–1972 (1976). Rhodes Cook. Congressional Quarterly. .

Further reading
 Julian P. Bretz. "The Economic Background of the Liberty Party". American Historical Review. vol. 34. no. 2 (January 1929). pp. 250–264. In JSTOR.
 
 Reinhard O. Johnson (2009). The Liberty Party, 1840–1848: Antislavery Third-Party Politics in the United States. Baton Rouge, LA. Louisiana State University Press.
 R.L. Morrow, "The Liberty Party in Vermont". New England Quarterly. vol. 2. no. 2 (April 1929). pp. 234–248. In JSTOR.
 Edward Schriver, "Black Politics without Blacks: Maine 1841-1848". Phylon. vol. 31. no. 2 (1970, Q-II). pp. 194–201. In JSTOR.
 Richard H. Sewell, "John P. Hale and the Liberty Party, 1847-1848". New England Quarterly. vol. 37. no. 2 (June 1964). pp. 200–223. In JSTOR.
 Ray M. Shortridge, "Voting for Minor Parties in the Antebellum Midwest". Indiana Magazine of History. vol. 74. no. 2 (June 1978). pp. 117–134. In JSTOR.
 Charles H. Wesley, "The Participation of Negroes in Anti-Slavery Political Parties". Journal of Negro History. vol. 29. no. 1 (January 1944). pp. 32–74. In JSTOR.
 Vernon Volpe (1990). Forlorn Hope of Freedom: The Liberty Party in the Old Northwest, 1838-1848. Kent, OH. Kent State University Press.

External links

 The Liberator Files – items concerning the Liberty Party from Horace Seldon's collection and summary of research of William Lloyd Garrison's The Liberator original copies at the Boston Public Library, Boston, Massachusetts.

Defunct political parties in the United States
Political parties established in 1840
Slavery in the United States
American abolitionist organizations
Political parties in the United States